Works by the British composer Herbert Howells (17 October 1892 – 23 February 1983).

Sacred choral works

Service settings and canticles
Missa Sine Nomine (Mass in the Dorian Mode) (1912)
 Magnificat and Nunc Dimittis in G (1918)
 Requiem (1936) 
 Collegium Regale (1944/45)
 Magnificat and Nunc Dimittis for Men's Voices and Organ (1941)
 Gloucester Service (1946)
 Te Deum and Bendictus for Christ Church Cathedral, Canterbury  (1947)
 Magnificat and Nunc Dimittis (New College Oxford) (1949)
 Magnificat and Nunc dimittis for St Paul's Cathedral (1950)
 Magnificat and Nunc Dimittis (Worcester) (1951)
 Hymnus Paradisi (1951)
 Te Deum and Bendictus for St.George's Chapel, Windsor  (1952)
 Missa Sabriensis for Worcester Cathedral  (1954)
 Office of the Holy Communion (Collegium Regale) (1956)
 Magnificat and Nunc Dimittis (St. Peter's, Westminster) (1957)
 Magnificat and Nunc dimittis (Collegium Sancti Johannis Cantabrigiense) (1957)
 Missa Aedis Christi (1958)
 Stabat Mater (1965)
 Te Deum for St. Mary Redcliffe, Bristol (1965)
 Magnificat and Nunc Dimittis (Sarum)  (1966)
 Te Deum for Searle Wright at St.Paul's Church Columbia University (1966)
 Magnificat and Nunc Dimittis (Winchester) (1967)
 Magnificat and Nunc Dimittis (Chichester) (1967)
 Magnificat and Nunc Dimittis (St.Augustine's Birmingham) (1967)
 Preces and Responses (1967)
 Coventry Mass (1968)
 Magnificat and Nunc Dimittis (Hereford) (1969)
 Magnificat and Nunc Dimittis (Collegium Magdalenae Oxoniense) (1970)
 Magnificat and Nunc Dimittis (York) (1973)
 Te Deum for the West Ridings Cathedrals Festival (1974)
 Magnificat and Nunc Dimittis (Dallas) (1975)
 Te Deum for Washington CathedralHymn tunes
 Erwin (1967)
 In Manus Tuas (1968)
 Kensington (1968)
 Michael ("All My Hope on God is Founded") (1938)
 Newnham (1968)
 Salisbury (1968)
 Sancta Civitas (1962)
 Twigworth ("God is love, let heaven adore him") (1968)

Anthems
 Blessed are the Dead (1920)
 By Whose Breath All Souls and Seeds are Living A Christmas Carol - So now is come our Joyful'st Feast (1957)
 Coventry Antiphon (1961)
 Even such is Time (1913)
 God be in my head (1966)
 God is Gone Up (1950)
 God Is Love A Golden Lullaby (1920)
 A Grace for 10 Downing Street (1972)
 Here is the little door (1918)
 Holy Spirit Ever Dwelling A Hymn for St. Cecilia (1960)
 I love all beauteous things (1977)
 O Pray for the Peace of Jerusalem (1941)
 Like as the hart (1941)
 The Key of the Kingdom (1947)
 King of Glory (1949)
 Latin Church Music I: Salve Regina & O Salutaris Hostia (1915)
 Latin Church Music II: Regina Caell Latin Church Music III: Nunc Dimittis Levavi oculos meos Long Long Ago (1950)
 Now Abideth Faith, Hope and Charity (1972)
 O Holy City (Sancta Civitas) (1968)
 Salvator Mundi (O Saviour of the World) (1981)
 Sing lullaby (1920)
 A Sequence for St. Michael (1961)
 A Spotless Rose (1919)
 Take him, earth, for cherishing (1963)
 Thee Will I Love (1970) 
 A True Story (1917)
 Tune thy Music (1927)
 Where Wast Thou? - Motet for Canterbury (1948)

Orchestral works
 Concerto for String Orchestra (1938)
 Fanfare (1977)
 The King's Herald (1937)
 Cello Concerto (1936)
 Merry-Eye (1920)
 Music for a Prince: Two Pieces for Orchestra (1948)
 Penguinski (1933)
 Piano Concerto No. 2 in C, Op. 39 (1925)
 Serenade for 4 solo violins and string orchestra (1917)
 Puck's Minuet (1917)
 Piano Concerto No. 1 in C minor, Op. 4 (1913)
 Suite for string orchestra (1942)
 Elegy for viola, string quartet and string orchestra, Op. 15 (1917)

Chamber works
 Three Dances (1915)
 Lady Audrey's Suite, Op. 19 (String Quartet No. 1) (1915)
 Piano Quartet in A minor, Op. 21 (1916)
 Fantasy String Quartet, Op. 25 (String Quartet No. 2) (1917)
 Rhapsodic Quintet, Op. 31 (1919)
 String Quartet No. 3, "In Gloucestershire" (1916–20)
 Oboe Sonata (1942) (suppressed)
 Clarinet Sonata (1946)

Keyboard works
 Summer Idyls (1911)
 Phantasy (1917)
 Harlequin Dreaming (1918)
 Lambert's Clavichord, opus 41 (1927)
 My Lord Harewood's Galliard (1949)
 Howells' Clavichord (1961)
 Polka for two pianos (1951)
 Finzi: His Rest (1956)
 Siciliana (1958)
 Pavane and Galliard (1964)
 Petrus Suite (1967-73)

Organ
 Cradle Song (1913)
 Flourish for a Bidding (1969)
 Fugue, Chorale and Epilogue (1940)
 Intrada No. 2 (1941)
 Master Tallis's Testament (1940)
 Organ Sonata No. 1 in C (1911)
 Paean (1940)
 Partita (1972)
 Prelude De Profundis (1958)
 Preludio Sine Nomine (1940)
 Three Rhapsodies (1919)
 Rhapsody No. 4 Bene Psallite in Vociferatione (1958)
 Saraband for the Morning of Easter (1940)
 Saraband in Modo Elegiaco (1945)
 Siciliano for a High Ceremony (1952)
 Six Pieces for organ (1945)
 Six Short Pieces for Organ
 Organ Sonata No. 2 (1933)
 St. Louis comes to Clifton (1977)
 Epilogue (Hovingham Sketches) (1974)
 Three Pieces for organ (1977)
 Three Psalm Preludes Set 1 (1916)
 Three Psalm Preludes Set 2 (1939)
 Two Pieces (1959)
 Two Slow Airs for Organ (1928)

Chorus and Orchestra
 Behold, O God, Our Defender (1952)
 An English Mass (1955)
 The House of the Mind (1954)
 A Hymn for St Cecilia (1960)
 Hymnus Paradisi (1938)
 A Kent Yeoman's Wooing Song (1933)
 A Maid Peerless (1951)
 Michael- a Fanfare Setting 
 Missa Sabrinensis - The Severn Mass (1954)
 O Mortal Man (Sussex Mummers' Carol)
 Sine Nomine: A Phantasy (1922)
 Sir Patrick Spens (1917)
 Stabat Mater (1963) 
 Te Deum (1944)
 When Cats Run Home (1907)

Harp
 Prelude for Harp (1915)

References

Citations

Sources

 
Lists of compositions by composer